Nangwee is a rural town and locality in the Toowoomba Region, Queensland, Australia. In the  the locality of Nangwee had a population of 52 people.

Geography 
The now-closed Cecil Plains railway line enters the locality from the east (Norwin) and exits to the west (Cecil Plains) with two now-abandoned stations serving the locality:

 Mywybilla railway station at the eastern boundary of the locality with Norwin
Nangwee railway station in the town in the west of the locality.

Road infrastructure
The Toowoomba–Cecil Plains Road runs through from east to west.

History 
The town takes its name from the Nangwee railway station, which was assigned on 12 December 1918 by the Queensland Railways Department, on the former Cecil Plains railway line, and is an Aboriginal word meaning muddy water.

Nangwee Provisional School opened on 7 June 1921. On 1 September 1922 it became Nangwee State School. It closed on 13 August 1961. It was at 69 McPherson Road.

In the  the locality of Nangwee had a population of 52 people.

References

External links 
 

Towns in Queensland
Toowoomba Region
Localities in Queensland